The 1976 New Zealand Open was a men's professional tennis tournament held in Auckland, New Zealand. It was an independent event, i.e. not part of the 1976 Grand Prix or 1976 World Championship Tennis circuit. The tournament was played on outdoor hard courts and was held from 5 to 11 January 1976. Onny Parun won the singles title.

Finals

Singles

 Onny Parun defeated  Allan Stone 7–6, 7–6, 6–3
 It was Parun's 1st title of the year and the 6th of his career.

References

External links
 ATP – tournament profile

Heineken Open
ATP Auckland Open
New Zealand Open
New Zealand Open